"A Touch of Paradise" is a song written by Ross Wilson, Gulliver Smith and Roger McLachlan. The song was originally recorded by Mondo Rock on their album Nuovo Mondo (1982). The song was covered by Australian singer John Farnham and American singer Kevin Paige. The song was released as the third single from his album Whispering Jack (1986). Whilst many believe that no music video was ever made for this song, while it was rarely seen one was made for its single release in late 1986.

Track listing
 "A Touch of Paradise" - 4:45
 "Help!"  (Live Version)  - 4:13

Chart history

References

1987 singles
1982 songs
Mondo Rock songs
John Farnham songs
Songs written by Ross Wilson (musician)